Theodor Gottlieb von Hippel may refer to:

 Theodor Gottlieb von Hippel the Elder (1741–1796), German satirical writer
 Theodor Gottlieb von Hippel the Younger (1775–1843), Prussian statesman, his nephew